Gregory John Carroll (born November 10, 1956) is a Canadian retired ice hockey centre.

Career 
Drafted in 1976 by both the Washington Capitals of the National Hockey League and the Cincinnati Stingers of the World Hockey Association, Carroll chose to play with the Stingers. He would also play for the New England Whalers. After playing two seasons in the WHA, he signed with the Capitals. He also played for the Detroit Red Wings and Hartford Whalers.

Career statistics

Regular season and playoffs

Awards
 WCHL Second All-Star Team – 1976

References

External links 

1956 births
Living people
Canadian ice hockey centres
Cincinnati Stingers draft picks
Cincinnati Stingers players
Detroit Red Wings players
Edmonton Canadians players
Hartford Whalers players
Medicine Hat Tigers players
National Hockey League first-round draft picks
New England Whalers players
Ice hockey people from Edmonton
Springfield Indians players
Washington Capitals draft picks
Washington Capitals players